The 1917 Colorado Silver and Gold football team was an American football team that represented the University of Colorado as a member of the Rocky Mountain Conference (RMC) during the 1917 college football season. Led by Bob Evans in his second and final year as head coach, Colorado compiled an overall record of 6–2 with a mark of 4–2 in conference play, placing third in the RMC.

Schedule

References

Colorado
Colorado Buffaloes football seasons
Colorado Silver and Gold football